26 may refer to:
 26 (number), the natural number following 25 and preceding 27
 one of the years 26 BC, AD 26, 1926, 2026
 26 (band), an Australian alternative rock group
 "Twenty Six", a song by Karma to Burn from the album Wild, Wonderful Purgatory, 1999
 "26", a 2014 song by Catfish and the Bottlemen from The Balcony
 "26", a 2017 song by Paramore from the album After Laughter
 Twenty-Six (novel), a 2003 novel by Leo McKay Jr.
 XXVI Holdings, a subsidiary company of Alphabet Inc.